Rumbo is a free weekly bilingual newspaper published in Lawrence, Massachusetts, United States, covering the Merrimack Valley and southern New Hampshire.

History 
Prior to 2014, the paper  would publish two editions - a regional edition and the local edition every other week making it a bi-weekly paper in some areas but weekly in Lawrence and Methuen.  In January 2014, the newspaper merged the two editions into one, making it a weekly regional newspaper.

Staff 
Dalia Diaz is the Director and Editor of Rumbo. She also has a radio show on WMVX 1110 AM.

References

External links
 Rumbo website

Lawrence, Massachusetts
Newspapers published in Massachusetts
Mass media in Essex County, Massachusetts
Mass media in Middlesex County, Massachusetts
Andover, Massachusetts
Haverhill, Massachusetts
Mass media in Lowell, Massachusetts
Methuen, Massachusetts
North Andover, Massachusetts
Manchester, New Hampshire
Nashua, New Hampshire
Salem, New Hampshire
Hillsborough County, New Hampshire
Rockingham County, New Hampshire
Bilingual newspapers
Spanish-language mass media in Massachusetts